Caloptilia iridophanes is a moth of the family Gracillariidae. It is known from Maharashtra, India.

The larvae feed on Buchanania lanzan. They mine the leaves of their host plant.

References

iridophanes
Moths of Asia
Moths described in 1935